Vice Admiral Charles Cornewall or Cornwall (1669 – 7 October 1718), of Berrington, Herefordshire, was an officer in the Royal Navy and politician who sat in the House of Commons between 1709 and 1718.

Origins

Cornewall was born in 1669, eldest of the eleven children of Robert Cornewall and Edith Cornwallis, and was baptised at Eye, Herefordshire, on 5 August 1669.

Career

Cornewall joined the navy in 1683 and was given his first command, the Sloop , on 19 September 1692. The following year he was given command of the 44-gun  and sailed under the command of Admiral Edward Russell to the Mediterranean, where he would remain until 1696.

On 27 January 1695, Adventure was one of a squadron of six frigates under the command of Commodore James Killegrew aboard . The flotilla was spotted by two French warships, the 60-gun Content and the 52-gun Trident, who closed on them believing them to be merchant ships. They retreated on discovering their mistake and were pursued by the British ships, the ensuing firefight lasting through the night and into the next morning before the French ships were compelled to surrender. Killigrew was killed in the action, and Cornewall was appointed to command the Plymouth in his place.

In 1701 he stood for parliament in Weobley against his cousin Henry Cornewall, but was defeated having gained just four votes. Returning to sea in March that year, he was given command of  but had to resign a few months later due to the sudden death of his father whose concerns, he wrote on 25 September 1701, "are like to prove more troublesome and tedious than I expected, though when settled may prove of very considerable advantage to my children." These affairs having been settled, he was appointed to command  but rejected it when it became clear that he would effectively be a second captain under John Leake in Newfoundland, protesting that "their sending a private captain to command … me in my own ship [was] a modest way of terming me a blockhead."

In that ship he returned to the Mediterranean where he served for the next two years, first under Clowdesley Shovell and then under Thomas Dilkes. In the autumn of 1707 he commanded a detached squadron operating off the coast of Naples, returning to England in March the following year.

In 1709 Cornewall changed his name to Cornwall, in an effort to distinguish between the different branches of his family, and stood once more for parliament. This time he was successful, being elected member for Bewdley on 2 March 1709. He did not spend much time in the house, being busy commanding squadrons in the Downs and off Dunkirk. In October 1710 he led a convoy to Smyrna aboard , but his Whig politics made it impossible to gain a further command on his return, and he languished on half-pay for some years.

The accession of George I in 1714 brought about a dramatic improvement in Cornwall's prospects, with him being appointed Controller of Storekeepers Accounts at  the Navy Board. In 1715 he returned to parliament as member for Weobley. He was promoted to the rank of rear admiral on 16 June 1716, and appointed Commander-in-chief in the Mediterranean in October the following year.

Sailing with his flag aboard , he took up his post in Gibraltar. His first task was to open negotiations with Ismail Ibn Sharif, emperor of Morocco to "demand satisfaction for the depredations of the Salé corsairs and procure the release of all His Majesty's subjects now captive in Barbary." When Ismail refused to release any of his slaves Cornwall established a blockade of his ports, but the measure had no effect on Ismail's policy despite the capture of several corsair vessels. During this time he engaged in a bitter dispute with the Governor, who refused to admit the admiral's authority even in matters relating to the ships in the port. Cornwall eventually resolved to put the matter before the King or the Speaker of the House of Commons, but was prevented from doing so by being once more engaged in active service.

Cornwall was promoted to vice admiral in March 1718, and became second-in-command to George Byng on the latter's arrival in the Mediterranean in June of that year, hoisting his flag aboard . Cruising with a combined force of nineteen ships of the line, two frigates and a galley off Syracuse they attacked a Spanish fleet in the battle of Cape Passaro on 31 July 1718. Attempting to avoid capture, the Spanish split into eight groups which the British chased down individually. Cornwall's part of the fleet was charged with the pursuit of the Marquis De Mari, who led a force of six ships of the line, nine frigates and a number of smaller vessels aboard his flagship El Real. Cornwall captured El Real and three other warships, with the Spanish burning seven more to avoid their capture.

After the battle, Cornwall transferred his flag back to HMS Argyll and convoyed the captured Spanish prizes to Port Mahon, from where he set sail for England. However, his health had been poor for some time, and on putting in at Lisbon on the homeward journey he died there on 7 October 1718. His body was conveyed home and buried in the south aisle of Westminster Abbey.

Cornwall's career had been illustrious without being spectacular, as John Charnock put it: "We have at least a very extraordinary, if not unequalled instance in this gentleman, of its being possible for an officer to serve, with the most irreproachable character, and to attain a very high rank in the service, without ever having it in his power to increase his reputation, by any of those brilliant exploits which fortune throws in the way of her greater favourites."

Family
Cornwall married twice, but no details of his first marriage survives. His second wife was Dorothy Hanmer daughter of Thomas Hanmer, with whom he had fourteen children:
 Henry Cornewall (b. 1698)
 Thomas Cornewall (b. & d. 1699)
 Sir Robert de Cornwall (1700–56), MP for Leominster
 Henrietta Cornewall (1701–28)
 Cyriac Cornewall (1702–1703)
 Charles Cornewall (b. & d. 1704)
 Job Cornewall (1705–28)
 Theophila Cornewall (1706–21)
 Jane Cornewall (b. 1708)
 Jacobs Cornewall (1709–38), father of Charles Wolfran Cornwall
 Emma Cornwall (1712–77), married Thomas Vernon
 Edith Cornwall (b. & d. 1712)
 Annabella Cornwall (1713–82)
 Mary Cornwall (b. 1714)

His estate at Berrington was inherited on his death by Sir Robert.

References

1669 births
1718 deaths
Members of the Parliament of Great Britain for English constituencies
British MPs 1708–1710
British MPs 1715–1722
Burials at Westminster Abbey
British military personnel of the War of the Quadruple Alliance
Royal Navy vice admirals
17th-century Royal Navy personnel
British naval commanders in the War of the Spanish Succession
Military personnel from Herefordshire